The 1995 Memorial Cup occurred May 13–21 at the Riverside Coliseum in Kamloops, British Columbia.  It was the 77th annual Memorial Cup competition and determined the major junior ice hockey champion of the Canadian Hockey League (CHL).  Participating teams were the host Kamloops Blazers, who were also the champions of the Western Hockey League, as well as the WHL runner-up Brandon Wheat Kings, and the winners of the Quebec Major Junior Hockey League and Ontario Hockey League, which were the Hull Olympiques and the Detroit Jr. Red Wings.  Kamloops won their second straight Memorial Cup, over Detroit.

Round-robin standings

Scores
Round-robin
May 13 Brandon 9-2 Hull
May 14 Detroit 4-3 Brandon
May 14 Kamloops 4-1 Hull
May 16 Kamloops 5-4 Detroit
May 17 Detroit 5-2 Hull
May 18 Kamloops 6-4 Brandon

Semi-final
May 20 Detroit 2-1 Brandon

Final
May 21 Kamloops 8-2 Detroit

Winning roster

Award winners
Stafford Smythe Memorial Trophy (MVP): Shane Doan, Kamloops
George Parsons Trophy (Sportsmanship): Jarome Iginla, Kamloops
Hap Emms Memorial Trophy (Goaltender): Jason Saal, Detroit

All-star team
Goal: Jason Saal, Detroit
Defence: Nolan Baumgartner, Kamloops; Bryan McCabe, Brandon
Centre: Darcy Tucker, Kamloops
Left wing: Sean Haggerty, Detroit
Right wing: Shane Doan, Kamloops

References

External links
 Memorial Cup 
 Canadian Hockey League

Memorial Cup 1995
Memorial Cup 1995
Sport in Kamloops